The 1920 United States presidential election in Oregon took place on November 2, 1920. All contemporary 48 states were part of the 1920 United States presidential election. Voters chose five electors to the Electoral College, who selected the president and vice president.

Background and vote
Oregon had been in the 1900s solidified as a one-party Republican bastion, which it would remain at a Presidential level apart from the 1910s GOP split until Franklin D. Roosevelt rose to power in 1932, and apart from a very short New Deal interlude at state level until the “Revolution of 1954”. As of 1920, the state had not elected a Democratic Congressman since 1878, and between 1900 and 1954 Democratic representation in the Oregon legislature would never exceed fifteen percent except during the above-mentioned 1930s interlude, so that Republican primaries would become the chief mode of competition.

In 1916, when a powerful "peace vote" due to opposition to participation in World War I allowed Woodrow Wilson to sweep most of the West and Great Plains, Western Oregon’s largely Yankee population  rejected Wilson’s progressivism as it had rejected the “free silver” politics of William Jennings Bryan in 1896. Thus, Oregon was the only Western state apart from South Dakota to back Charles Evans Hughes, although Ozark mountaineer-settled Eastern Oregon did vote for Wilson.

By the beginning of 1920 skyrocketing inflation and Wilson's focus upon his proposed League of Nations at the expense of domestic policy had helped make the incumbent President very unpopular – besides which Wilson also had major health problems that had left First Lady Edith effectively running the nation. Political unrest seen in the Palmer Raids and the "Red Scare" further added to the unpopularity of the Democratic Party, since this global political turmoil produced considerable fear of alien revolutionaries invading the country. Demand in the West for exclusion of Asian immigrants became even stronger than before.

Despite the fact that Oregon had been the only Western state to support Hughes and had not voted Democratic in a two-way race for over half a century, Cox did visit the state on September 14 to discuss Prohibition, saying that the League of Nations was an opportunity that would not be repeated (“This League or None”). Cox also said whilst touring the West that Prohibition should not be an issue as it would depend on enforcement rather than the actual passage of the Eighteenth amendment.

Oregon went with this tide, voting strongly for Republican nominee, Ohio Senator Warren G. Harding, over Democratic nominee Ohio Governor James M. Cox. Harding carried every county in the state; however, the conservatism of Western Oregon where most of the state’s population resided meant that the swing toward the Republicans was extremely muted vis-à-vis any other Western State, and also that left-wing third parties did not have the impact they did in Washington State or some states in the Midwest. In fact, Oregon was the only state in the West, Plains or Upper Midwest except New Mexico where the swing against the Democrats was less than the national swing, and indeed it was Harding’s weakest state north of the Missouri–Iowa border and west of the Great Lakes.

Results

Results by county

See also
 United States presidential elections in Oregon

References

Oregon
1920
1920 Oregon elections